Maidstone is the county town of Kent, England.

Maidstone may also refer to:

Places

United Kingdom

 Borough of Maidstone, a borough in Kent, England, administrative centre Maidstone
 Maidstone United F.C., the borough's association football team
 HM Prison Maidstone, a men's prison located in the borough 
 Maidstone Airport, Kent, a former airport serving the town between 1917 and 1969

Canada
 Maidstone, Ontario in Essex County, Ontario
 Maidstone Township, Ontario also in Essex County, Ontario
 Maidstone, Saskatchewan in Canada
 Maidstone Aerodrome, serving the town

United States
 Maidstone, Vermont
 Maidstone State Park in Maidstone, Vermont
 Maidstone Golf Club in East Hampton, New York
 Maidstone (Owings, Maryland) one of the oldest houses in Maryland

Other places
 Maidstone, Victoria, Australia
 Maidstone Park, a sports ground in Upper Hutt in New Zealand
 Maidstone Road a small residential street in Tokwawan, Kowloon, Hong Kong
 Maidstone, Jamaica a Free Village in Manchester parish, Jamaica
 Maidstone, KwaZulu Natal, South Africa; See All Saints Church, Maidstone, KwaZulu-Natal

Other uses
 Maidstone (film), a 1970 film by Norman Mailer

See also
 HMS Maidstone, several ships